This is the complete list of Olympic medalists in rugby sevens.

Seven-a-side

Men's

Women's

Notes

References
International Olympic Committee results database

Rugby union
medalists
Lists of rugby union players